Pine lake is a deep seepage lake near the community of Springwater, Wisconsin, in Waushara County, located in central Wisconsin. It is one of eight lakes that can be found in the township of Springwater. This lake is 137 acres with a 48-foot maximum depth. It is a popular attraction for both fisherman and boaters .Pine Lake is holomictic, which means that the water layers mix at least once a year throughout the whole lake. The water of the lake is moderately clear.

Origins and history
Pine Lake was formed as a result of glacial melting thousands of years ago. Since it is a deep seepage lake, there were no inflows or outflows. Before Settlers arrived in the area in 1851, the watershed was a hunting and fishing ground for Native Americans. Agriculture and farming dominated the shoreline and watershed of Pine Lake until cottages and development increased post World War II. From post World War II to current day the shoreline has been highly developed with homes. One exception to this development of shoreline is on the North shore of the western portion of the lake, which is owned by a Lutheran Camp.

Physical aspects
Pine Lake is a seepage lake, meaning that it fills primarily through groundwater seepage. There is some surface water and runoff that contributes to the volume, but the majority is from groundwater. The water clarity listed by the Wisconsin DNR is moderately clear. Pine Lake is considered a Mesotrophic lake due to the amounts of vegetation and wildlife seen in the lake habitats. This causes increased vegetation as well as occasional algal blooms. These changes are affected by the  uses of the lake: boating and fishing. As of May 2019 there was a major change to the boating laws that may affect the type of lake habitat that is seen. The Wisconsin DNR and a poll done with the lake residents made the decision in 2019 making the lake have no wake restrictions for boaters. This decision will have a large effect on the lake environment due to  wave disturbance from boaters, possibly causing an increase in species richness.

Geography
The Pine Lake watershed is 2,679 acres, and the primary land use in this area is forested. The shoreline environment mainly consists of  wetlands and development with all of the lake side cabins and homes. There is  groundwater seepage from the areas of the watershed include manure  and pesticides from local agriculture.

Geology
Pine Lake has a mostly sandy bottom with 10% muck and 90% sand. The water in the basin flows from north to south,; therefore chemicals north of the lake such as fertilizer  seep into groundwater.

Water quality and chemistry
mean total phosphorus: 33 micrograms per liter 
 Average pH of 8.6
 Chloride (mg/L): 2.3  Sodium (mg/L): 2.0  Potassium(mg/L): .55 
 Moderate to high hardness of 120 mg/L
 Alkalinity of 119 mg/L

Living/biological/wildlife

Flora and fauna
There are many aquatic plants located in Pine lake, the most common of which is muskgrass (Chara spp.) and stoneworts (Nitella spp.). Muskgrass serves as cover for fish species and is also a food source for birds. There were 24 species of aquatic plants counted from the Waushara County Lakes study, other species included a variety of pondweed species. The overall health of the aquatic plant community is listed as good, earning a C value of 8.

Ecology
Most of the Pine lake basin is covered by forested area.

Environmental concerns

Invasive species
Two of the most notable invasive species are the Banded Mystery Snail, as well as Eurasian Water-Milfoil.
Eurasian water milfoil infestations cluster up in areas and are often caught in boat motors, thus making recreational activities such as fishing more difficult. Milfoi were first found in the lake in 2001; it can be a problem because it can form up into dense beds and affect  the fisheries, boaters, and dissolved oxygen in the lake. It is difficultto eradicate the milfoil  because all it takes to produce a new plant is about a one-inch fragment from another plant.

Management
The lake plants are in good health and there are occasional blooms as with most of the mesotrophic lakes in the county. There are some agricultural lands in the basin of Pine lake and phosphorus is the most  common chemical from with runoff and pollution. Studies and samples show that the agricultural chemical atrazine was found in small amounts (10 micrograms) in water samples(1).

Human use/cultural significance

Fishing
The most common species that are seen in the lake are largemouth bass and panfish. Some other species that can occasionally be seen are northern pike, walleye, black crappie, and rock bass.

Recreation
A Pine Lake survey concluded that the most valuable aspect of the lake was the amenity of living on the lake and participating in recreational activities as well as viewing wildlife. It is common for boaters and kayakers to use the lake in the summer, and ice fishermen to use it during winter months.

References

 N. Turyk, R. Haney and D Rupp. 2014. Waushara County Lakes Study Pine Lake - Springwater, Final Report to Waushara County and Wisconsin Department of Natural Resources, UW-Stevens Point Center for Watershed Science & Education.
 "Water-Quality and Lake-Stage Data for Wisconsin Lakes, Water Years 2008-2011" (PDF). Retrieved 2 December 2020.

Lakes of Waushara County, Wisconsin